"Who I Am" is a song written by Brett James and Troy Verges, and recorded by American country music artist Jessica Andrews.  It was released in November 2000 as the first single and title track from her album of the same name.

Background
In a 2001 interview, Andrews explained that she recorded the song (which was written by Brett James and Troy Verges) because she felt that its lyrics were especially fitting to her own life: "Everything is so true in that song, except that my grandmother's name is not Rosemary. It's about believing in yourself and being supported by those around you. No matter how many mistakes you make, your friends and family will be there for you."

Content
The song is a mid tempo country song in which the narrator tells of how, no matter what her future, she will be satisfied with her life, because she is confident about herself, and she knows that her peers will still support her.

Use in media
Sections of this song are featured in the opening theme of TV police drama Sue Thomas: F.B.Eye. It also appeared on an episode of Lizzie McGuire.

Critical reception
Rick Cohoon of Allmusic described the song favorably, saying that it "seems to echo Andrews’ self-confidence in moving forward to face the challenges of the music industry".

Music video
The song's video, directed by filmmaker Jon Ragel, focuses mainly on Andrews singing in a flower field, on a swing, and beside a brick wall. Actual home footage of her childhood is interspersed throughout the video, and it ends with her waking up in bed and smiling, having dreamt the whole thing.

Cover versions
Country music artist Danielle Bradbery featured a cover of "Who I Am" on the deluxe version of her debut album Danielle Bradbery, having sung this song as a tribute to her family during the semi-finals of Season 4 of The Voice, which she eventually won.

Chart performance
The song has sold 361,000 copies in the US as of June 2013.

Year-end charts

References

2000 singles
Jessica Andrews songs
Songs written by Brett James
Songs written by Troy Verges
Song recordings produced by Byron Gallimore
DreamWorks Records singles
Television drama theme songs
2000 songs